Diocese of Bloemfontein may refer to:

 the Anglican Diocese of the Free State, formerly the Diocese of Bloemfontein
 the Roman Catholic Archdiocese of Bloemfontein